The Ashley Montagu Resolution refers to the petition to the World Court to end the genital modification and mutilation of children worldwide.

Endorsement of the petition also includes the 1989 Universal Declaration on Circumcision, Excision, and Incision which holds that medically unnecessary surgical circumcisions, excisions and incisions on male and female genitals constitute an act of cruel, inhuman and degrading treatment within the terms of Article 5 of the Universal Declaration of Human Rights.

The original endorsers include Nobel Laureate in Physiology and Medicine Francis Crick and National Organization of Circumcision Information Resource Centers founder Marilyn Milos. The petition has also been signed by at least two Nobel Prize winners and Jonas Salk.

See also 
 Ashley Montagu
 Genital integrity

External links 
 'The Ashley Montagu Resolution'

Genital modification and mutilation
Human rights instruments